is a former Japanese football player.

Playing career
Kato was born in Kyoto Prefecture on July 28, 1974. After graduating from high school, he joined Gamba Osaka in 1993. However he did not play often. In 1996, he played several matches as a defender. In 1997, he moved to the Japan Football League club Oita Trinity. In 1998, he moved to the Regional Leagues club Sagawa Express Osaka. He retired at the end of the 2001 season.

Club statistics

References

External links

1974 births
Living people
Association football people from Kyoto Prefecture
Japanese footballers
J1 League players
Japan Football League (1992–1998) players
Gamba Osaka players
Oita Trinita players
Association football defenders